Annita McPhee is the former three-term president of the Tahltan Nation in British Columbia, Canada. She was also named National Native Role Model by Governor-General Adrienne Clarkson in 2000 and won the Aboriginal Woman of Distinction Award.

Education 
McPhee attended the University of Victoria law school and Thompson Rivers University social work school. Her family placed a strong emphasis on education.

Political career 
McPhee was a key player in negotiating more than $2 billion in agreements for the Tahltan Nation over the Northwest Transmission Line, BC Hydro and AltaGas projects within their territory. She also helped negotiate self-determination and taxation revenue-sharing projects.

On April 4, 2019, McPhee signed papers to seek the New Democratic Party candidacy in the Canadian federal riding of Skeena—Bulkley Valley.

References

Bibliography
Anita McPhee, Indigenous Leadership Award Honoree at Ecotrust

Living people
20th-century First Nations people
21st-century First Nations people
Canadian women lawyers
First Nations women in politics
Indigenous leaders in British Columbia
Place of birth missing (living people)
Tahltan people
Thompson Rivers University
University of Victoria Faculty of Law alumni
Women in British Columbia politics
Year of birth missing (living people)
20th-century Canadian women politicians